In rapping and poetry, multisyllabic rhymes (also known as compound  rhymes, polysyllable rhymes,  and sometimes colloquially in hip-hop as multis) are rhymes that contain two or more syllables An example is as follows:

I've got a bad taste / It gives me mad haste.

Multisyllabic rhyme is used extensively in hip-hop, is considered a hallmark of complex and advanced rapping, and artists are often praised for their multisyllabic rhymes by critics and fellow rappers. This is in contrast to its use in the majority of other forms of poetry, where multisyllabic rhyme is rarely used, apart from in comic verse where it is used for comic effect by poets such as Ogden Nash.

Usage in hip-hop

The book How to Rap breaks multisyllabic rhymes down extensively. In it, Kool G Rap gives an example of this kind of rhyme, rhyming "random luck" with "handsome fuck" and "vans and trucks". Other examples in the book include two syllable rhymes such as rhyming “indo” with “Timbo” and rhymes with irregular numbers of syllables such as “handle it” and “candle to it”.

How to Rap shows that multisyllabic rhymes are used by the following artists: Big L, Black Thought, Canibus, Common, Mos Def, Pharoahe Monch, Tonedeff, Inspectah Deck, Big Daddy Kane, Kool G Rap, Rakim,  Eminem, Big Pun, Arrested Development, Masta Ace, Lady of Rage, Snoop Dogg, Jay-Z, Beastie Boys, Esoteric of 7L & Esoteric, Game, Busta Rhymes, Method Man, Nas, and MF DOOM, although there are many more not specified throughout the book.

Multisyllabic rhymes are one of several rhyming devices which have increased in usage throughout the history of rapping, along with such devices as internal rhymes and offbeat rhymes. Music scholar Adam Krims, writing in 2001, noted the following artists as exemplifying the increased complexity in rhyming, including use of multisyllabic rhyming: “members of the Wu-Tang Clan, Nas, AZ, Big Pun, Ras Kass, and Elzhi, just to name a few”.

Some MCs have used multisyllabic rhymes consisting of five or more rhyming syllables. For example, on MF Doom's song "Meat Grinder", from the album Madvillainy, he raps: "Borderline schizo / Sorta fine tits though."

Usage in poetry
Lord Byron (1788-1824) used multisyllabic rhymes in his satiric poem Don Juan. For example, he rhymes "intellectual" with "hen-peck'd you all".

Ogden Nash (1902-1971) used multisyllabic rhymes in a comic, satirical way, as is common in traditional comic poetry. For example, in his poem ‘The Axolotl’ he rhymes "axolotl" with "whaxolotl".

Gerard Manley Hopkins (1844–89) is one of few poets who used multisyllabic rhymes to convey non-satirical subject matter.
An example of this is ‘The Bugler's First Communion’, where he rhymes "boon he on" with "Communion".

See also
Feminine rhyme
Rhyme Genie

Notes

References
Edwards, Paul (2009). How to Rap: The Art & Science of the Hip-Hop MC. Chicago Review Press, .
The craft of lyric writing. Sheila Davis 1985 Writer's Digest Books 
"Fishing by Obstinate Isles: Modern and Postmodern British Poetry and American Readers" Keith Tuma 1998 Northwestern University Press 

Rapping
Rhyme